Genivolta is a comune (municipality) in the Province of Cremona in the Italian region Lombardy, located about  east of Milan and about  northwest of Cremona.

Genivolta borders the following municipalities: Azzanello, Casalmorano, Cumignano sul Naviglio, Soncino, Soresina, Villachiara.

References

Cities and towns in Lombardy